Partschins is a comune (municipality) in the province of South Tyrol in northern Italy, located about  northwest of the city of Bolzano.

Geography

Partschins borders the following municipalities: Algund, Lana, Marling, Moos in Passeier, Naturns, Plaus, Schnals, and Tirol.

Frazioni
The municipality of Partschins contains the frazioni (subdivisions, mainly villages and hamlets) Sonnenberg (Montesole), Quadrathöfe (Quadrato), Rabland (Rablà), Tabland (Tablà), Töll (Tel) and Vertigen (Vallettina).

History

Coat-of-arms
The emblem represents a plow, placed diagonally on argent. The emblem is similar to that of the Knight Randolf von Partschins, a descendant of the noble family Götsch, who founded the village in about 1200, under the name Castle Stachlburg. The emblem was adopted July 25, 1967.

Society

Linguistic distribution
According to the 2011 census, 95.94% of the population speak German, 3.79% Italian and 0.27% Ladin as first language.

Demographic evolution

References

External links

 Homepage of the municipality

Municipalities of South Tyrol